Gordon Shirley (born 16 October 1956) is a Jamaican academic and diplomat who served as Jamaican ambassador to the United States. He was a Pro Vice Chancellor and Principal of the University of the West Indies (UWI) and Executive Chairman of the Jamaica Public Service Limited.

Education 
Shirley holds a bachelor of engineering from Saint Augustine University and a Master's of Business Administration in Operations & Finance and a doctorate degree in Business Administration from Harvard University.

Career 
Shirley served as Jamaican ambassador to the United States and permanent representative to the Organization of American States from 2004 to 2007. In 2007, he was appointed pro vice chancellor and principal of the University of the West Indies (UWI) serving until 2013, when he became Chairman of the PAJ Board of Directors.

References 

Jamaican academics
Jamaican academic administrators
Jamaican diplomats
Living people
1956 births
Ambassadors of Jamaica to the United States
Permanent Representatives of Jamaica to the Organization of American States
University of the West Indies academics
Harvard Business School alumni